The term IBM platform could refer to any of the hardware and operating systems below.

Current

IBM Power Systems, a family name for the merged System p and System i
PureSystems, an IBM product line of factory pre-configured components and servers also being referred to as an "Expert Integrated System"
IBM Z, a family name used by IBM for all of its z/Architecture mainframe computers from the Z900 on; this is the most recent architecture descended from IBM System/360 
IBM System z, an older name for IBM Z
IBM z System, an older name for IBM Z
IBM PC compatible, a machine compatible with the IBM PC and successors.
IBM i, an operating system that runs on IBM Power Systems and IBM PureSystems, preceded by:
CPF, the operating system for the S/38
OS/400, the operating system for the AS/400
i5/OS, the operating system for the eServer i5
z/OS, a 64-bit operating system for IBM mainframes; this is the most recent incarnation of OS/360 and successors

Discontinued

IBM System i, preceded by S/38, AS/400 and eServer i5, is a line of midrange computer systems from IBM that uses the IBM i operating system
IBM System p, formerly known as RS/6000, was IBM's RISC/UNIX-based server product line. 
IBM System/360, the predecessor to S/370
IBM System/370, the predecessor to XA/370
IBM Extended Architecture/370 (XA/370), the predecessor to ESA/370
IBM Enterprise Systems Architecture/370 (ESA/370), the predecessor to IBM System/390
IBM System/390, the predecessor to IBM System z
IBM Personal Computer, commonly known as the IBM PC, is the original version of the IBM PC compatible hardware platform
Operating System/360 (OS/360), IBM's flagship operating system for S/360 and early S/370
OS/VS1, successor to OS/360 MFT
SVS, OS/VS2 Release 1, successor to OS/360 MVT and predecessor to MVS
MVS/370 is a generic term for all versions of the MVS operating system prior to MVS/XA
OS/VS2 Release 2 through 3.8
MVS/System Extension (MVS/SE)
MVS/System Product (MVS/SP) Version 1
MVS/XA, predecessor of MVS/ESA
MVS/ESA, predecessor of OS/390
OS/390, predecessor of z/OS

Suprercomputer platforms:
IBM Scalable POWERparallel (1993-2000)
QCDOC (1998-1999)
IBM Blue Gene (1999-2015)
IBM iDataPlex (2008-2014)
IBM PERCS (2011)
IBM Intelligent Cluster, (2001-2014, now Lenovo Intelligent Cluster)

See also
IBM System (disambiguation)